Platyptilia washburnensis is a moth of the family Pterophoridae. It is found in North America.

References

Moths described in 1929
washburnensis